Stephen Wright may refer to:
 Stephen Wright (English footballer) (born 1980), English footballer
 Stephen Wright (Scottish footballer) (born 1971), Scottish footballer
 Stephen Wright (Australian rules footballer) (born 1961), Australian rules footballer
 Stephen Wright (writer) (born 1946), American writer
 Stephen Wright (diplomat) (born 1946), British ambassador to Spain
 Stephen Wright (cricketer) (1897–1975), English cricketer
 Stephen J. Wright (1910–1996), American academic administrator and president of the United Negro College Fund

See also
Steven Wright (disambiguation)